The Alcazar d'Été was a Café-concert which opened in 1869, at 8 Avenue Gabriel in Paris, and closed in 1914.

The old Café Morel behind the Élysée Palace was acquired in 1869 by Arsène Goubert who at the time was owner of the "Alcazar" at 10 Rue du Faubourg Poissonière.  He gave it the name "Alcazar d'Été", and the "Alcazar" became "Alcazar d'Hiver".  It is today the "Pavilion Gabriel".

Principal Artists Featured

 Thérésa (Emma Valladon)
 Paulus (comic singer Jean-Paul Habans)
 Polin (French singer) (Pierre-Paul Marsalés)
 La Belle Otero
 Mistinguett
 Yvette Guilbert
 Fragson
 Paula Brébion

External links
 See many contemporary posters by Jules Chéret advertising Alcazar d'Été

References

François Caradec & Alan Weill, Le Café-Concert, Fayard, 2007 (in French)

Cabarets in Paris
Entertainment venues in Paris
Music venues completed in 1860
Former theatres in Paris